Vladislav Tseytlin (born 23 August 1971) is an Uzbekistani football referee who has been a full international referee for FIFA.

Tseytlin became a FIFA referee in 2002. He has served as a referee in the 2006 and 2014 FIFA World Cup qualifiers.

References 

1971 births
Living people
Uzbekistani football referees
Uzbekistani people of Russian descent